Bayani: Fighting Game, alternatively known as Bayani: Kanino Ka Kakampi? is an upcoming Philippine indie fighting video game developed by Ranida Games which features characters inspired from historical figures from Philippine history.

Characters
As of August 2018, the roster of Bayani features eight playable warriors. The roster consists of Joe Rizal, Dre, Rio, Anton, Leon, Lolang Tsora, Fernando, and Oria.

Development

Game design
Bayani was developed by local game developer, Ranida Games. It is a 1-on-1 fighting game

Robert Edward Cruz is the lead game designer while a dedicated developer was tasked to work on one of the characters of the game. Anthony Dacayo is responsible for the character designs while cel shading is used to render the characters.

The characters are inspired from historical figures often considered as national heroes while historical events and landmarks were also used as basis for other elements of the game's design. However the game is set in the far future where the Philippines is known as the Neorepublic of the Philippines and Europe is known as Neuropa.

In terms of fighting mechanics, there are three types of attack commands; light, medium, heavy. Certain combinations allows players to perform combo attacks. Air juggle mechanic is also incorporated in the game allowing the player to send their opponent's character in the air and hit them multiple times before they fall to the ground.

Marketing
Bayani was first announced to the public by Ranida Games during the 2016 Electronic Sports and Gaming Summit at the SMX Convention Center in Pasig. A prototype version of the game featuring just two characters, Joe Rizal and Dre, was showcased with attendees allowed to play a demo of the game. At the 2017 iteration of the summit, Ranida Games showcased Bayani again.

From August 27 to 31, 2018 a more complete version of the game was made available for demo play at the SM City Masinag as a commemoration of National Heroes Day.

The game was officially released on June 12, 2019 on Steam for early access, the full version is in development and other consoles are planning in the future, but it was delayed due to the COVID-19 pandemic.

References

External links

Upcoming video games
Fighting games
Cultural depictions of Filipino people
Cultural depictions of José Rizal
Video games developed in the Philippines
Video games featuring female protagonists
Video games postponed due to the COVID-19 pandemic
Video games set in the future
Video games set in the Philippines
Video games with cel-shaded animation
Multiplayer and single-player video games
Windows games